The Five O'Clock Girl is a musical with a book by Guy Bolton and Fred Thompson, music by Harry Ruby, and lyrics by Bert Kalmar. It focuses on wealthy Beekman Place playboy Gerald Brooks and impoverished shopgirl Patricia Brown, who become acquainted with each other via a series of anonymous five o'clock phone conversations.

The original Broadway production opened at the 44th Street Theatre on October 10, 1927. On April 16, 1928, it transferred to the Shubert Theatre, where it completed its total run of 280 performances on June 2. Directed by John Harwood and choreographed by Jack Haskell, it starred Oscar Shaw as Gerald Brooks, Mary Eaton as Patricia Brown, Pert Kelton as Susan Snow, and Danny Dare as Ronnie Webb. Costume design was by Charles LeMaire, and Norman Bel Geddes was the scenic designer.

A West End production opened at the London Hippodrome on March 21, 1929.

The musical was staged at the Goodspeed Opera House in East Haddam, Connecticut and the Walnut Street Theatre in Philadelphia before returning to Broadway, where it ran for six previews and 14 performances at the Helen Hayes Theatre between January 22 and February 8, 1981. Directed by Sue Lawless and choreographed by Dan Siretta, the cast included Lisby Larson, Richard Ruth, Roger Rathburn, Dee Hoty, and Pat Stanley. In his review in The New York Times, Frank Rich called it "amiably silly" and said it "is not without passing interest as an arcane footnote to theatrical history, but as entertainment in 1981 it's a pretty slim affair." He added, "The show's book is tiresomely long, and its gags are unshucked corn. Pretty soon we're living just for the songs, and very few of them prove to be worth living for."

1927 song list
Act I      
I'm One Little Party
We Want You
Thinking of You
Happy Go Lucky
Up in the Clouds
Any Little Thing
Following in Father's Footsteps
Lonesome Romeos
Tea Time Tap
Thinking of You (Reprise)
Act II      
Who Did?
Society Ladder
Tell the World I'm Through
Up in the Clouds (Reprise)
Who Did? (Reprise)

1981 song list
Act One     
In the Old Neighborhood
Keep Romance Alive
Thinking of You
I'm One Little Party
Up in the Clouds
My Sunny Tennessee
Any Little Thing
Manhattan Walk
Act II      
Long Island Low Down
Who Did? You Did!
Any Little Thing (Reprise)
Nevertheless,
All Alone Monday
Dancing the Devil Away
Up in the Clouds (Reprise)

Film adaptation
In 1928, Marion Davies and Joel McCrea starred in a screen adaptation directed by Robert Z. Leonard for Metro-Goldwyn-Mayer, but it never was released, possibly because William Randolph Hearst objected to his mistress Davies portraying a common shopgirl in her first sound film.

References

External links
Original 1927 Broadway production at the Internet Broadway Database
1981 Broadway revival at the Internet Broadway Database

1927 musicals
Broadway musicals
Musicals set in the Roaring Twenties